Conospermum canaliculatum is a shrub endemic to Western Australia.

It blooms between July and December producing white flowers.

It is found in the Mid West and Wheatbelt regions of Western Australia where it grows in sandy soils.

References

External links

Eudicots of Western Australia
canaliculatum
Endemic flora of Western Australia
Plants described in 1848